Robert Baratheon is a fictional character in the A Song of Ice and Fire series of epic fantasy novels by American author George R. R. Martin, and its television adaptation Game of Thrones, where he is portrayed by English actor Mark Addy.

Introduced in 1996's A Game of Thrones, Robert is the eldest son and heir of Lord Steffon Baratheon. He is a close friend to Ned Stark, both being wards of Lord Jon Arryn. After his betrothed Lyanna Stark was allegedly kidnapped by prince Rhaegar Targaryen, Robert, Ned and Jon started a rebellion against the "Mad King" Aerys II Targaryen. After crushing the Targaryen dynasty and winning the war, during which Lyanna died, Robert took the Iron Throne. He married Tywin Lannister's daughter Cersei to ensure political stability. Although Robert's reign is relatively peaceful, he proves to be an ineffective ruler. He is unhappy in both his marriage to Cersei, whom he abuses, and his responsibilities as king, and lives a life of infidelity and wanton excess. He fathers many bastards, and is unaware that his three children with Cersei had been fathered by her twin brother Jaime Lannister.

Although Robert dies in the first novel, the legacy of his rebellion and reign continues to have a great impact on the contemporary events of Westeros. His death creates a power vacuum in which his brothers and Cersei's eldest son Joffrey fight for control of the Seven Kingdoms while Robb Stark and Balon Greyjoy fight for secession, known as the War of Five Kings.

Character background 
Robert Baratheon was the oldest son and heir of Lord Steffon Baratheon and Lady Cassana Estermont. In his youth, he was the ward of Jon Arryn and was raised at the Eyrie alongside Eddard Stark, with whom he was closer than his brothers. When he was 16, his parents drowned and died during a storm, and he became the Lord of Storm's End. He was betrothed to Ned's younger sister Lyanna, with whom he was madly (and unrequitedly) in love. After Lyanna disappeared with Rhaegar Targaryen, and the execution of Eddard's father, Rickard and brother, Brandon Stark King Aerys II called for Robert and Ned's heads. Jon Arryn refused and began what is now called Robert's Rebellion. Robert played a key role in the downfall of the Targaryen dynasty and killed Rhaegar in single combat.  He married Cersei Lannister to ensure House Lannister's support for his rule.

Personality and description
Robert is in his mid-thirties when the events of the books begin.  Although being a quarter Targaryen (through his paternal grandmother Rhaelle), Robert has the classical Baratheon look: black hair and bright blue eyes, with dense black body hair on his chest and around his sex.  He is a very tall man, with Eddard estimating his height to be .  As a young adult, Robert was handsome, clean-shaven, strong and powerful, and muscled "like a maiden's fantasy".  However, after he won the Iron Throne, Robert becomes very obese due to excessive feasting and drinking, gaining at least  of weight, and turns into an often red-faced man with dark circles underneath his eyes and appears half-drunk and sweating when walking, with a wild, thick, fierce beard that hides his double chin.

In his youth, Robert is fearless in battle with a powerful voice, wielding a large spiked iron war hammer too heavy for Eddard Stark to lift, and was a formidable warrior well-loved by soldiers.  Though headstrong, rash, and impatient, Robert can be merciful towards his enemies as long as they are honest and brave, and can inspire loyalty and friendship in even enemies via charisma alone.  Although deconditioned after becoming king due to weight gain and frequent drinking, Jaime Lannister still believes that Robert is stronger than him.

Robert is a jovial man of huge appetites and knows to indulge in pleasures.  He is quite promiscuous, having fathered multiple bastard children (17 according to the prophecy by Lannisport fortuneteller Maggy the Frog) with whores or any women he encounters, and his lusts are the subject of ribald drinking songs throughout the realms.  As king, Robert is known to impose upon the hospitality (voluntarily or not) of his subjects, but at the same time also possesses a rather careless generosity.  A proud man, Robert rarely backs down on words spoken in a drunken rant. As king, Robert is no longer used to someone disagreeing with him, which makes him vulnerable to manipulation by others. Robert loathes his responsibilities as king and frequently expresses his preference to winning the throne in battle rather than sitting on it. He has never truly loved his wife and is unaware that none of his three children with her are his, but instead Jaime Lannister's. Under his reign, the realm has been bankrupted, and Robert is deeply in debt to his wife's family. Tyrion Lannister considers Robert to be "a great blustering oaf", while Varys describes him as a fool.  His queen wife, Cersei Lannister, considers him to be an ignorant, dumb, slow-witted, drunken brute who does not have the ruthless streak she believes a king requires.  According to Petyr Baelish, Robert is practised at closing his eyes to things he would rather not see.

Storylines 

Robert Baratheon is not a point of view character in the novels, so his actions are mainly witnessed and interpreted through the eyes of Ned Stark.  He only appears in the first book of the series A Game of Thrones, though he is mentioned numerous times in the later books by characters such as Cersei Lannister.

A Game of Thrones 

King Robert has come to Winterfell to appoint his close friend Eddard Stark the Hand of The King, after the untimely death of Jon Arryn. He was unaware that Cersei's three children were fathered by her twin brother Jaime.  More interested in food, drink, and tourneys than in governance, Robert has squandered the royal treasury, leaving the crown heavily in debt.  After a hunting accident orchestrated by Cersei, Robert is mortally wounded by a wild boar and appoints Eddard as the regent for his son Joffrey.  After Robert's death, Eddard loses the political struggle against the Lannisters and is later publicly executed by beheading. The kingdoms plunge into civil war known as the War of the Five Kings (which encompasses the entirety of the following two books) in which Robert's two brothers Renly and Stannis Baratheon both declare themselves the rightful kings. Eddard's vengeful son Robb and later Balon Greyjoy also secede and declare kingships.

Family tree of House Baratheon

TV adaptation
Mark Addy plays Robert Baratheon in the television adaption of the series of books. According to showrunners David Benioff and D. B. Weiss, Addy's audition for the role was the best they had seen and he was the easiest actor to cast for the show.

Season 1 

Robert's storyline is the same in the show as it is in the novels. However, his wife Cersei reveals that she had one stillborn son by him, which is not the case in the novels, where Cersei uses guile and trickery to prevent him from ever actually engaging in sexual intercourse with her while drunk.

Season 2 
After his death, Robert's bastards are ordered to be killed by his heir Joffrey Baratheon, Robert's supposed legal heir and the new king; Gendry, subsequently flees the capital.

Seasons 6 & 7 
In seasons six and seven, Bran Stark's gift of vision as the Three-Eyed Raven reveals to him the truth of Rhaegar and Lyanna's relationship, that Lyanna willingly fled with Rhaegar and married him in secret, and states that "Robert's Rebellion was built on a lie," even though it was the Mad King's crimes against House Stark that started the rebellion in the first place.

Season 8 
Following the Night King's defeat and the destruction of the White Walkers and the army of the dead, Daenerys Targaryen legitimizes Gendry as Gendry Baratheon, naming him Robert's lawful son and the new Lord of Storm's End.

References 

A Song of Ice and Fire characters
Fiction about regicide
Fictional alcohol abusers
Fictional murdered people
Literary characters introduced in 1996
Fictional characters who committed familicide
Fictional domestic abusers
Fictional rapists
Fictional hunters
Fictional kings
Fictional knights
Fictional lords and ladies
Fictional revolutionaries
Fictional war veterans
Male characters in literature
Male characters in television
Mariticide in fiction
Television characters introduced in 2011
Deaths due to boar attacks